Northcott is a hamlet in Cornwall, England. Northcott is north of Bude and on the coast close to Northcott Mouth.

References

Hamlets in Cornwall